Les Gentilhommes is a ballet for nine men choreographed by New York City Ballet's balletmaster-in-chief Peter Martins to Georg Friedrich Händel's 1739 Concerti grossi, Op. 6, Nos. 9 and 2 (Largo). The premiere took place on May 15, 1987, at the New York State Theater, Lincoln Center.

Les Gentilhommes was subtitled "Skol, Stanley!" at its premiere and is dedicated to the late Stanley Williams, co-chairman of faculty at the School of American Ballet, who taught Martins at the Royal Danish Ballet school. The ballet consists of three trios of different moods preceded and followed by sections for the whole ensemble, concluding with a solo. "In Gentilhommes, I didn't just want to make a big bravura piece, showing beats and double air turns, but showing how elegantly and beautifully men can move."

Casts

Original 

   
 Gen Horiuchi
 Peter Boal
 Carlo Merlo
 Jeffrey Edwards
 Michael Byars
 Damian Woetzel
 Richard Marsden
 Cornel Crabtree
 Runsheng Ying

Footnotes  

Ballets by Peter Martins
Ballets to the music of George Frideric Handel
1987 ballet premieres
New York City Ballet repertory